Monarca is Mexican drama streaming television series created and produced by Diego Gutiérrez. It stars Osvaldo Benavides, Juan Manuel Bernal, Rosa María Bianchi, and Irene Azuela. The plot revolves around a billionaire tequila magnate and his family in the corrupt world of Mexico's business elites riddled with scandal and violence. The series was released on September 13, 2019, on Netflix. On October 24, 2019, the series was renewed for a second season which premiered on January 1, 2021. In March 2021, the series was canceled after two seasons.

Cast
Irene Azuela as Ana María Carranza Dávila
Osvaldo Benavides as Andrés Carranza Dávila
Juan Manuel Bernal as Joaquin Carranza Dávila
Rosa María Bianchi as Cecilia Dávila Vda. De Carranza
Antonio de la Vega as Bernardo
Luis Rábago as Agustín Carranza
Sophie Gómez as Amelia
James Hyde as Martin Ross
Carla Adell as Camila Ross Carranza
Regina Pavón as Lourdes Carranza
Dalí Jr González as Pablo Carranza
Alejandro de Hoyos as Rodrigo Ross Carranza
José Manuel Rincón as Gonzalo Carranza
Daniela Schmidt as Pilar Ortega
Gabriela de la Garza as Jimena
Fernanda Castillo as Sofía Carranza
Alejandro de la Madrid as Ignacio
Marcus Ornellas as Jonás

Episodes

Season 1 (2019)

Season 2 (2021)

References

External links

2010s Mexican drama television series
2019 Mexican television series debuts
2020s Mexican drama television series
Spanish-language Netflix original programming